Oriol Vinyals (born 1983) is a Spanish machine learning researcher at DeepMind.

Education and career 
Vinyals was born in Barcelona, Spain. He studied mathematics and telecommunication engineering at the Universitat Politècnica de Catalunya. He then moved to the US and studied for a Master's degree in computer science at University of California, San Diego, and at University of California, Berkeley, where he received his PhD in 2013 under Nelson Morgan in the Department of Electrical Engineering and Computer Science.

Vinyals co-invented the seq2seq model for machine translation along with Ilya Sutskever and Quoc Viet Le. He is the leader of Google AlphaStar's AI research group, which applies artificial intelligence to computer games such as StarCraft II.

In 2016, he was chosen by the magazine MIT Technology Review as one of the 35 most innovative young people under 35.

See also 
 Ilya Sutskever

References 

Living people
Google employees
Machine learning researchers
University of California, Berkeley alumni
University of California, San Diego alumni
Polytechnic University of Catalonia alumni
Computer scientists
1983 births
People from Barcelona
Spanish computer scientists